Pachucos are male members of a counterculture associated with zoot suit fashion, jump blues, jazz and swing music, a distinct dialect known as caló, and self-empowerment in rejecting assimilation into Anglo-American society that emerged in El Paso, Texas, in the late 1930s. The pachuco counterculture flourished among Chicano boys and men in the 1940s as a symbol of rebellion, especially in Los Angeles. It spread to women who became known as pachucas and were perceived as unruly, masculine, and un-American. Some pachucos adopted strong attitudes of social defiance, engaging in behavior seen as deviant by white/Anglo-American society, such as marijuana smoking, gang activity, and a turbulent night life. Although concentrated among a relatively small group of Mexican Americans, the pachuco counterculture became iconic among Chicanos and a predecessor for the cholo subculture which emerged among Chicano youth in the 1980s.

Pachucos emerged in El Paso, Texas, among a group of Chicano youth who were influenced by African American culture and urban 'hep cats,' although it may have roots in Pachuca, Hidalgo, Mexico, where loose-fitting clothing was popular among men. It later spread throughout the Southwest into Los Angeles, where it developed further. In the border areas of California and Texas, a distinct youth culture known as pachuquismo developed in the 1940s and has been credited as an influence to Chicanismo. Pachuco zoot suiters were influenced by Black zoot suiters in the jazz and swing music scene on the east coast. In LA, Chicano zoot suiters developed their own cultural identity, "with their hair done in big pompadours, and 'draped' in tailor-made suits ... They spoke caló, their own language, a cool jive of half-English, half-Spanish rhythms ... Out of the zoot-suiter experience came lowrider cars and culture, clothes, music, tag names, and, again, its own graffiti language."

Pachucos were perceived as alien to both Mexican and Anglo-American culture–a distinctly Chicano figure. In Mexico, the pachuco was understood "as a caricature of the American", while in the United States he was perceived as so-called "proof of Mexican degeneracy." Mexican critics such as Octavio Paz denounced the pachuco as a man who had "lost his whole inheritance: language, religion, customs, belief." In response, Chicanos heavily criticized Paz and embraced the oppositional position of the pachuco as an embodied representation of resistance to Anglo-American cultural hegemony. To Chicanos, the pachuco had acquired and emanated self-empowerment and agency through a "stylized power" of rebellious resistance and spectacular excess.

Etymology
The word "pachuco" is uncertain, but one theory connects it to the city of El Paso, Texas, which was sometimes referred to as "Chuco Town" or "El Chuco".  People migrating to El Paso from Ciudad Juarez would say, in Spanish, that they were going "pa' El Chuco". Some say "pa El Chuco" comes from the words Shoe Co., a shoe company that was located in El Paso in the 1940s during the war. The majority of Mexican migrants would cross the border in order to work for this famous shoe company in El Paso. Throughout the years the term "pa El Chuco" was used when Mexican immigrants were heading to El Paso looking for a job. In order to cross the American border with success the migrants would have to dress nice and look nice other wise they would get rejected at the border.  These migrants became known as pachucos.

"Pachuco" could also have derived from the name of the city of Pachuca, Hidalgo, Mexico, as the majority of Mexican migration to the United States came from the Central Plateau region, of which Hidalgo is a part.

Another theory says that the word derives from pocho, a derogatory term for a Mexican born in the United States who has lost touch with the Mexican culture. The word is also said to mean "punk" or "troublemaker". Yet another theory is put forth by author Laura L. Cummings who postulates a possible indigenous origin of the term.

Connections have also been found between "Pachucos" and mixed civilians who lived near the Mexican–American border during the turn of the century, and between "Pachucos" and the poor soldiers who fought in the Mexican Revolution in the armies of Pancho Villa.

Pachucos called their slang Caló (sometimes called "pachuquismo"), a unique argot that drew on the original Spanish Gypsy Caló, Mexican Spanish, the New Mexican dialect of Spanish, and American English, employing words and phrases creatively applied. To a large extent, Caló went mainstream and is one of the last surviving vestige of the Pachuco, often used in the lexicon of some urban Latin Americans in the United States to this day. The influence of Valdés is responsible for the assimilation of several Caló terms into Mexican slang.

Style 

Pachuco style was a dominating trend among Mexican-American youth in the 1930s-40s.  Pachucos became known for their distinguished look, dialogue, and actions.  Pachucos dressed in recognizable Zoot suits, and often styled their hair into ducktails. Things like decorative chains and tattoos were also sometimes part of the pachuco look. The unique speech of pachucos was a very important element of their defined style.  Consisting of creative phrases and some English words, Caló was a very popular form of speech among pachucos.  Pachucos were seen as gangsters in the eyes of conservative Americans with ethnic prejudices.

Culture
 It is known that German Valdés” Tin Tan” lived in Cd Juarez Chihuahua Mexico, where the word Pachuco emerged from. 
The Mexican Nobel laureate Octavio Paz writes in the essay, "The Pachuco and Other Extremes" that the Pachuco phenomenon paralleled the zazou subculture in World War II-era Paris in style of clothing, music favored (jazz, swing, and jump blues), and attitudes. Although there was no known link between the two subcultures, they both are most certainly derivative localized blends of American pop culture in the United States.

While he was not the first Mexican comedian to perform as a Mexican American zoot suiter, Mexican comedian and film actor German Valdés better-known by his artistic name "Tin-Tan" is Mexico's most famous and celebrated pachuco.

Pachuco culture in America was at its height during World War II.  The Wartime Productions Board in 1942 thought it necessary to cut back on fabric consumption, so they enacted regulations on the amount of fabric used for suits. This enactment targeted Pachucos in particular because of the excess fabric used in their zoot suits. Pachucos boldly chose not to follow these regulations, demonstrating rebellious attitudes and pride in their culture. Pachucos continued to flaunt zoot suits, now attained through bootleg tailors. As a result, these flashy zoot suits were seen as unpatriotic by other Americans. This controversial series of events helped shape Pachuco culture, and zoot suits became a symbol of cultural pride among Mexican-Americans. It didn't all end well, however, as this also led to rising tension between Pachucos and other Americans, playing a part in the start of the 1944 Zoot Suit Riots.

The pachuco subculture declined in the 1960s, evolving into the Chicano style. This style preserved some of the pachuco slang while adding a strong political element characteristic of the late 1960s American life.

In the early 1970s, a recession and the increasingly violent nature of gang life resulted in an abandonment of anything that suggested dandyism. Accordingly, Mexican-American gangs adopted a uniform of T-shirts and khakis derived from prison uniforms, and the pachuco style died out. However, the zoot suit remains a popular choice of formal wear for urban and rural Latino youths in heavily ethnic Mexican neighborhoods. It is typically worn at a prom, in weddings, parties or in some cases, at informal Latino university commencement ceremonies.

La Pachuca

The "Pachuca," the female counterpart of the Pachuco, had an aesthetic sensibility as strong as the male zoot suiter. The Pachuca's hairstyle tended to be a high "coif" or bouffant, with the hair put up in some way (a more pronounced version of the typical hair style of the time) by ratting their hair or affixing hair rats. Their makeup was heavy, particularly using a red colored lipstick. The preferred colors of clothing were black and gray. Some pachucas wore the traditionally male zoot suit, albeit with modifications to fit the female form. Sometimes, she donned the standard heavy gold pocket chain. Another variation involved a sweater or coat - often a variant on the male zoot-suit finger-tip jacket - over knee-length skirts, plus fishnet stockings or bobby socks and platform shoes. Extravagant dresses were and are also common among pachucas. Like the entire culture, the fashion aesthetic revolved around the concept of "see and be seen."

Costa Rica 
The term "" is used in Costa Rica to define Costa Rican slang. It nevertheless differs from the Mexican slang.

In Costa Rica the term "pachuco" refers to someone who has common habits and who is often very rude.  In Costa Rica the word pachuco refers to a person who has manners that are socially unacceptable and often uses shocking language when speaking. Pachuco is also a pejorative name given to certain colloquial words and expressions. Some consider pachuco and its pachuquismos to be Costa Rica's second language.

See also

 Zoot Suit Riots – a confrontation between pachucos and U.S. servicemen in Los Angeles during World War II in which unarmed pachucos were brutally beaten and jailed
 The opening scenes of the film American Me depict confrontations between pachucos and white American soldiers during the Zoot Suit Riots.
 The Sleepy Lagoon murder was a confrontation between two Los Angeles pachuco gangs that resulted in a crackdown on the culture.
 Cholo and Vato are terms for modern-day Chicano street gangsters, though the association with the zoot suit is no longer present.

References

Further reading
Barker, George Carpenter. Pachuco: an American-Spanish argot and its social functions in Tucson, Arizona. University of Arizona Press, 1950.

Cummings, Laura L. Pachucas and Pachucos in Tucson: Situated Border Lives. University of Arizona Press, 2009.
Fuentes, Dagoberto and José A. López. Barrio Language Dictionary. La Puente: El Barrio Publications, 1974. 
Madrid Barela, A. In Search of the Authentic Pachuco. An Interpretive Essay, Part I. Aztlan, Spring, 4(1), 31 60. 1973.
Paz, Octavio, translated by Lysander Kemp. "The Pachuco and Other Extremes" in The Labyrinth of Solitude. Grove Press, Inc., 1961; originally published in Spanish by Cuadernos Americanos, Mexico, 1950.
Ramirez, Catherine Sue Crimes of Fashion: The Pachuca and Chicana Style Politics.  Meridians Vol. 2, No. 2 (2002):  1–35.
Ramirez, Catherine S. The Woman in the Zoot Suit. London: Duke University Press, 2009. Print.
raúlrsalinas, Un Trip Through the Mind Jail y Otras Excursiones. San Francisco: Pocho Ché, 1980.
Sánchez-Tranquilino, M. "The Pachuco's Flayed Hide: Mobility, Identity, and Buenas Garras" In J. Tagg – Cultural Studies, New York: Routledge, 1992
 Serrano, Rodolfo G. "Dictionary Of Pachuco Terms". California State University, 1979.
 Manuel Cantú – Pachuco Dictionary, . Pachuco Dictionary Home Page

Mexican culture
Chicano
History of subcultures
Youth culture in the United States
Mexican youth culture
Subcultures
Spanish language in the United States